Khakian (also Romanized as Khākīān) is a village in Kasma Rural District, in the Central District of Sowme'eh Sara County, Gilan Province, Iran. At the 2006 census, its population was 347, in 84 families.

References 

Populated places in Sowme'eh Sara County